Daved Hild (born in 1951) is an American drummer, accordionist and singer-songwriter. He is perhaps best recognized for his collaborations with David Thomas and Kramer.

History 
In the late seventies, while studying art history at the Museum of Fine Arts in Boston, Hild formed the experimental punk band The Girls with Robin Amos, George Condo and Mark Dagley. Their first and only studio release was the seven-inch single "Jeffrey I Hear You"/"The Elephant Man", produced by David Thomas of Pere Ubu fame. Eventually Hild joined Thomas in his band The Wooden Birds and played on Monster Walks the Winter Lake, released in 1986. He released several albums on Shimmy Disc with Ralph Carney and Kramer, serving as the primary lyricist, vocalist and drummer for the compositions.

Discography 
The Girls
"Jeffrey I Hear You"/"The Elephant Man" (Hearthan, 1979)

The Wooden Birds
 Monster Walks the Winter Lake (Twin/Tone, 1986)

Collaborations
with Ralph Carney and Kramer: Happiness Finally Came to Them (Shimmy Disc, 1987)
with Ralph Carney and Kramer: Black Power (Shimmy Disc, 1994)
with Kramer: Rubber Hair (Shimmy Disc, 1997)

References 

1959 births
American accordionists
American punk rock drummers
American male drummers
Musicians from Florida
Place of birth missing (living people)
Living people
20th-century American drummers
21st-century accordionists
20th-century American male musicians
21st-century American male musicians